The following outline is provided as an overview of and topical guide to exercise:

Exercise – any bodily activity that enhances or log physical fitness and overall health and wellness. It is performed for various reasons including strengthening muscles and the cardiovascular system, honing athletic skills, weight loss or maintenance, as well as for the purpose of enjoyment. Frequent and regular physical exercise boosts the immune system, and helps prevent the "diseases of affluence" such as heart disease, cardiovascular disease, Type 2 diabetes and obesity.

Types of exercise

Aerobic exercise 

Aerobic exercise –
 Aerobics
 Circuit training
 Cycling
 Hiking
 Power walking
 Running
 Skipping rope
 Swimming
 Walking

Anaerobic exercise 
Anaerobic exercise –
 Bodybuilding
 Eccentric training
 Functional training
 Sprinting
 Weight training

Strength training 
Strength training (by muscle to be strengthened; (c) = compound exercise, (i) = isolated exercise)
 Abdomen and obliques (belly)
 Crunch (i)
 Leg raise (c)
 Russian twist (c)
 Sit-up (c)
 Biceps (front of arms)
 Biceps curl (i)
 Pull ups with a supinated grip
 Calves
 Calf raise (i)
 Deltoids (shoulders)
 Front raise (i)
 Head stand into Handstand push-up (c)
 Lateral raise (i)
 Military press (c)
 Rear delt raise (i)
 Shoulder press (c)
 Upright row (c)
 Extended length conditioning
 Forearms
 Wrist curl (i)
 Wrist extension (i)
 Hamstrings (back of thighs)
 Deadlift (c)
 Frog jumping (i)
 Good-morning (c)
 Leg curl (i)
 Squat (c)
 Lats and trapezius (back)
 Bent-over row (c)
 Chin-up (c)
 Pulldown (c)
 Pullup (c)
 Seated row (c)
 Shoulder shrug (i)
 Supine row (c)
 Lower back
 Deadlift (c)
 Good-morning (c)
 Hyperextension (c)
 Pectorals (chest)
 Bench press (c)
 Chest fly (i)
 Dips
 Machine fly (i)
 Push-up (c)
 Pelvis
Vaginal weightlifting
 Quadriceps (front of thighs)
 Frog Jumping (i)
 Leg extension (i)
 Leg press (c)
 Lunge (c)
 Squat (c)
 Triceps (back of arms)
 Close-grip bench press (c)
 Dip (c)
 Pushdown (i)
 Triceps extension (i)

Calisthenics 
A form of exercise consisting of a variety of movements that exercise large muscle groups.

Calisthenics
 Abdominal exercise
Burpees
 Calf-raises
 Crunches
 Dips
 Hyperextensions
 Jumping jacks
 Leg raises
 Lunges
 Muscle-ups
 Plank
 Pull-ups
 Push-ups
 Sit-ups
 Squat jumps (Toyotas/box jumps)
 Squats

Additional calisthenics exercises that can support the muscle groups –
 Bend and reach (back and legs stretch)
 High jump (full body stretch)
 Rower (back, upper legs and abdomen) 
 Squat bend (full body stretch)

Stretching exercises 

Stretching –
 Ballistic stretching
 Dynamic stretching
 PNF stretching
 Static stretching
 Passive stretching

Specialized training methods 

 Altitude training
 Ballistic training
 Boxing training
 Circuit training
 Complex training
 Cross training
 Endurance training
 Long slow distance
 Grip strength training
 Interval training
 Plyometrics (jump training)
 Power training
 Strength training
 High intensity training
 Suspension training
 Weight training
 Resistance training
 Training to failure

Other 
 Physical therapy
 Pilates
 Yoga

Exercise and health 
 Exercise trends

Health benefits of exercise

 Aerobic conditioning
 Neurobiological effects of physical exercise - improves:
 Executive function
 Memory
 Stress management
 Physical fitness, including improving and maintaining these aspects of it:
 Accuracy
 Agility
 Balance
 Coordination
 Endurance
 Flexibility
 Power
 Speed
 Stamina
 Strength
 Prevention – exercise helps prevent:
 Cancer
 Drug addiction
 Hypertension
 Major depressive disorder
 Neurodegenerative disorders
 Obesity
 Osteoporosis
 Type 2 Diabetes

Dangers of exercise 

 Cramps
 Dehydration
 Heat stroke
 Overtraining
 Sports injury
 Sprain – pull or rupture ligaments
 Strain – pull or rupture muscles
 Tendon rupture
 Achilles tendon rupture

Terminology 
 Buff –
 Recovery –
 Reps –
 Ripped –
 Sets –
 Warm up –
 Workout –

Nutritional
 Amino acid –
 Creatine
 Dietary supplement –
 Energy drink –
 Formula –
 Protein –
 Snack bar –
 Vitamin B12
 Vitamin B2
 Vitamin B6
 Whey protein –

Biological
 Joint
 Muscle
 Muscle fiber
 Muscle tissue
 Tendon

History of exercise 

 Aerobic exercise § History
 Bodybuilding § History
 Exercise § History
 Exercise physiology § History
 Exercise trends
 Fitness boot camp § History
 Fitness culture
 Outdoor fitness § History
 Physical culture

Exercise equipment 

List of exercise equipment

Traditional 
 Barbell
 Bench
 Cable attachments
 Chin-up bar
 Dumbbell
 Kettlebell
 Metal bar
 Punching bag
 Treadmill

Other 

 Abdomenizer
 Aerobie
 Air flow ball
 Atlas Bar ergonomic cable attachment
 Balance board
 Baoding Balls
 Battling ropes
 Bicycle
 Bone exercise monitor
 BOSU
 Bowflex
 Bulgarian Bag
 Bullworker
 Carva
 Communications Specification for Fitness Equipment
 Cybex International
 Elliptical trainer
 Exercise ball
 Exercise machine
 Exertris
 Fitness trail
 Foam roller
 Galileo
 Gamebike
 Gravity boots
 Grippers
 Gymnasticon
 Heart rate monitor
 Hydraulic Exercise Equipment
 ICON Health & Fitness
 Indoor rower
 Inversion therapy
 Isometric exercise device
 Jade egg
 Lifting stone
 Mallakhamb
 Medicine ball
 NordicTrack
 Outdoor gym
 PCGamerBike
 Pedometer
 Pole dance
 Power tower
 Power-Plate
 Range of Motion
 Resistance band
 Roman chair
 RowPerfect
 Scrum machine
 Slant board
 Soloflex
 Stairmaster
 Stationary bicycle
 Thighmaster
 Total Gym
 Training mask
 Treadmill
 Treadmill Desk
 Treadmill with Vibration Isolation System
 Treadmill workstation
 Vaginal cone
 Wall bars
 Weighted clothing
 Wheelchair trainer
 Wobble board
 Wrist roller
 Yoni egg

 Barbell
 Bench (weight training)
 Bowflex
 Bulgarian Bag
 Cable machine
 Captains of Crush Grippers
 Dip bar
 Dumbbell
 Halteres (ancient Greece)
 Indian clubs
 Iron rings
 IronMind
 Kettlebell
 Leg press
 Power cage
 Shake Weight
 Smith machine
 Soloflex
 Total Gym
 Trap bar
 TRX System
 Universal Gym Equipment
 Weight machine
 York Barbell

Physiology of exercise 

Exercise physiology
 Aerobic exercise
 Anaerobic exercise
 Exercise induced nausea
 Grip strength
 Muscle hypertrophy
 Overtraining
 Stretching
 Supercompensation
 Warming up
 Weight cutting
 Weight loss

Health monitor 

Remote physiological monitoring
 Blood pressure
 Body fat percentage
 Heart rate
 Pulse rate
 Respiration rate

Miscellaneous concepts 
Fitness professional
Personal trainer
 Weighted clothing

Significant people of physical fitness 
 Arnold Schwarzenegger
 Erwan Le Corre
 Georges Hébert (b.1875-d.1957)
 Jack LaLanne (b.1914-d.2011)
 John Basedow
 Joseph Pilates (b.1883-d.1967)
 Lance Armstrong
 Robyn Landis
 Roger Bannister
 Susan Powter

Lists 

 List of exercise equipment 
 List of weight training exercises

See also
Outline of health
 Outline of nutrition
 Outline of sports
 Sportswear

References

External links

Alberta Centre for Active Living Physical Activity @ Work website
American College of Sports Medicine website
Yahoo! Health

Exercise
Exercise